Van Galen is a Dutch toponymic surname. One town of origin is "Galen", now , a village 25 km from the Dutch border in the district of Wesel in Germany. The Galen family finds its origin there as well. Other families, particularly the variants Van Gaalen and Van Gaal, originated in the hamlet of Gaal near Schaijk, North Brabant. People with the surname include:

Barry van Galen (born 1970), Dutch football midfielder
Berend van Galen (1606–1678), Dutch and local name of the Prince-bishop of Münster
Johan van Galen (1604–1653), Dutch Navy Commodore
 (born 1972), Dutch water polo player and coach
Variant spellings
Alexander van Gaelen (1670–1728), Dutch battle and hunting scenes painter
Chad VanGaalen (born 1977), Canadian singer-songwriter and illustrator
Kenny van Gaalen (born 1988), Dutch sidecarcross rider

See also
HNLMS Van Galen, five ships of the Royal Netherlands Navy named after Johan van Galen
Louis van Gaal (born 1951), Dutch football player and coach

References

Dutch-language surnames
Toponymic surnames